WWZW (96.7 MHz) is a commercial FM radio station licensed to Buena Vista, Virginia, and serving the Lexington area and part of the Lynchburg metropolitan area.  WWZW is owned and operated by First Media Radio, LLC.  It broadcasts a classic hits radio format.  The studios and offices are on Main Street in Lexington.

WWZW has an effective radiated power (ERP) of 2,000 watts.  The transmitter is on Blue Ridge Parkway near U.S. Route 60 in Buena Vista.

History
Its original call sign was WREL-FM. It was the sister station to WREL 1450 AM in Lexington. In 1985, Equus Communications acquired WREL-AM-FM for $185,000. The two stations simulcast a full service country music format.

On July 22, 2004, WREL-AM-FM were sold to First Media Radio.  On August 10, 2004, WREL-FM switched its call letters to WWZW to match co-owned station WZWW in Bellefonte, PA.  On November 1, 2004, WWZW, still a country music station, adopted the "3WZ" branding, the same branding used by sister WZWW, an adult contemporary station.

On February 2, 2005, First Media Radio changed WWZW's format from country to adult contemporary.  Sister WREL-AM remained a Talk station.

In July 2009, WWZW switched from an adult contemporary to classic hits as "Classic 96.7 3WZ".

References

External links
Classic 96-7 3WZ Online

WZW
Classic hits radio stations in the United States
Radio stations established in 1960